Jaisalmer Fort Jain temples is a group of 7 Jain temples inside Jaisalmer Fort in state of Rajasthan. The Jaisalmer Fort is UNESCO World Heritage Site as part of Hill Forts of Rajasthan and is famous for its ancient Jain temples. The temples are well known for their intricate carvings and attract many tourists and religious devotees.

History 
Jaisalmer Fort has a complex of seven Jain temples built by yellow sandstone during 12-16th century.  Chandraprabha temple was built in 1509 CE. Askaran Chopra of merta built a huge temple dedicated to Sambhavanatha housing more than 600 idols and Gyan Bhandar (grand library) with oldest hand written books scripted on Bhojpatra and Tadputra. There are about 1,000 old manuscripts written on palm leaf with painted wooden covers. These manuscripts dates back to 12th century. The library also contains paintings, astrological charts, and a copy of dronacharya's Oghaniryaktivritti. Chopra Panchaji built Ashtapadh temple inside the fort.

Sambhavanatha temple and Parshvanath temple houses inscription dated 1440 CE and 1416 CE installed during the reign of Rawal Dūdā.

Architecture 

Jaisalmer Fort has a large complex of seven Jain temples. These Jain temples of Jaisalmer are considered architectural wonders. The group of Jain temple consist of Parsvanatha temple, Sambhavanatha temple, Shitalanatha temple, Shantinatha and Kunthunatha temple, Chandraprabha temple and Rishabhanatha temple.

The temple contains frescoes, mirrors and other forms of detailing, the temples boast exquisite designs, with the walls of the temples features intricate carvings of animals and human figures similar to Dilwara temples.

The Parshvanatha temple is the oldest and the most beautiful temple in the complex. The temple houses a black marble idol of Parshvanatha with a hood of a serpent with multiple heads over his head, similar to that of in Lodhurva Jain temple. The temple is rich in craftsmanship and exquisite carvings. The garbhagriha wall bears carvings of animals and human figures. The shikhar of the temple is crowned with amalaka. The temple features an ornate porch and the main shrine is surrounded by 52 small shrines.

Chandraprabha temple plan consists of the mandapa with iconic architecture. Rishabhanatha temple houses an idol of Rishabhanatha safeguarded with glass cabinets. The remaining two temples i.e. Shantinath and Kunthunath contain beautiful carvings. Ashtapadh temple features images of Vishnu, Kali and Lakshmi along with Jain deities.

Photo gallery

See also 
 Dilwara temples
 Ranakpur Jain temple
 Lodhurva Jain temple

References

Citations

Bibliography

Books

Web

External links 
 

Jain pilgrimage sites
Tourist attractions in Rajasthan
12th-century sculptures
Buildings and structures in Jaisalmer